Daif Abdul-kareem Al-Ghazal (1976–2005) was a prominent Libyan journalist and writer who was murdered in Libya in May 2005.

Early life
Daif Al-Ghazal was born in Benghazi in 1976. His father is a descendant of the Al-Shahibat tribe, a prominent Eastern Libyan tribe, and his mother is from the Al-Hawara tribe which is equally well known. He studied at Garyounis University, where he received a History degree from the Literature department.

In the 1980s, Daif Al-Ghazal joined the Movement of Revolutionary Committees (MRC). The MRC was set up by the government to propagate the ideologies of Libyan leader Muammar al-Gaddafi, as expressed in The Green Book. In the early 1990s Al-Ghazal joined the new Benghazi Mathaba. He advanced within the MRC hierarchy, and was appointed to the coveted post of Media and Culture Coordinator. He continued working as a journalist and was named chief editor of the Benghazis office of Al-Zahf Al-Akhdar ("The Green March" in Arabic).

Opposition to the Libyan Government
Differences between Al-Ghazal and the MRC began appearing in 2003. These differences were clearly articulated in his columns published in the newspaper, Al-Zahf Al-Akhdar. In 2004, he delivered a lecture on government corruption at the Green Book Research Center. His criticisms lead the Libyan government to fight him viciously, especially members of the MRC of Al-Berka in Benghazi. On February 27, 2005, Al-Ghazal told the online newspaper Libya al-Yaum ("Libya Today" - based in London) that he was the victim of oppression and undue process because of his articles, criticism and reports. Following this announcement, Al-Ghazal was summoned to the office of communication where he was interrogated. Despite claimed numerous threats, Al-Ghazal continued writing articles in 2004 and 2005, exposing these alleged threats in Internet newspapers published outside Libya.

Murder
On May 21, 2005, and according to Mohammed Abdul Malek London-based human rights organization Libya Watch, Daif Al-Ghazal was abducted by two armed individuals who announced that they were from internal security as he returned from visiting a friend and was accompanied another journalist named Mohamed Al-Marghani, near a farm located in the Huary region. On May 30, 2005, the Garyounis police informed Al-Ghazal's family that an unknown body beginning to decompose was found, which they requested them to identify. Daif Al-Ghazal was buried on June 3, 2005.

The autopsy report, obtained by Libyan Human Rights Solidarity, referred to many signs of torture. Most of his fingers had been severed, and the body had multiple bruises and stab wounds. Al-Ghazal was killed from a bullet wound to the head.

The Libyan government remained quiet for fifteen days, from the time of his abduction, to the discovery of his body and subsequent burial. Libyan Justice Minister Ali Hasnaoui then officially announced that Al-Ghazal was found murdered, and further added that he was actually of Egyptian descent; this was abhorred by Al-Ghazal's family. Questions remain despite promises made by Justice Minister Hasnaoui to reveal the circumstances surrounding the murder, and the adoption of the case by Saif al-Islam Gaddafi, head of the Gaddafi Institute for Development.

Notes

External links
Arab Press Freedom Watch
Reporters Without Borders

Libyan journalists
People from Benghazi
1976 births
2005 deaths
20th-century journalists